Richard Alexander Fownes (born 26 October 1983) is a musician from Brighton, England. He currently plays and writes for  With Scissors. He also plays live for UNKLE.

Fownes joined The Eighties Matchbox B-Line Disaster after Andy Huxley's departure in 2005, but in 2008 he left to join Nine Inch Nails. However this plan collapsed and he was replaced with Justin Meldal-Johnsen. He has since played in The Duke Spirit and Clever Thing.

References

1983 births
English rock guitarists
English male guitarists
Living people
People from Brighton
People educated at Alleyn's School
21st-century British guitarists
21st-century British male musicians